In some team sports, a selector is a member of a selection panel which chooses teams or individuals to represent a country or club or other representative team in sporting competitions.

For example, a selector in cricket is an administrative position involved in choosing players to represent a particular team in a match. Or, in Gaelic games a selector (sometimes referred to by the Irish term roghnóir) is a person who helps pick a team to represent a club or county team.

Selectors may be past players, but can also be current coaches. Current captains may also have an influence.

See also
 Glossary of cricket terms
 Glossary of Gaelic games terms
 Glossary of rugby union terms

References

Sports terminology